This is a list of the National Register of Historic Places listings in Presque Isle County, Michigan.

This is intended to be a complete list of the properties and districts on the National Register of Historic Places in Presque Isle County, Michigan, United States. Latitude and longitude coordinates are provided for many National Register properties and districts; these locations may be seen together in a map.

There are 15 properties and districts listed on the National Register in the county.

Current listings

|}

See also

 List of National Historic Landmarks in Michigan
 National Register of Historic Places listings in Michigan
 Listings in neighboring counties: Alpena, Cheboygan
 List of Great Lakes shipwrecks on the National Register of Historic Places

References

Presque Isle